Richard Eu Yee Ming (born 1947) is a Singaporean businessperson and musician. He is the chairman of healthcare firm Eu Yan Sang.

Early life
Richard Eu Yee Ming was born in 1947, to a wealthy ethnic Chinese household of Cantonese ancestry. He spent his childhood at the now-demolished Eu Villa, which was once then "one of Singapore's largest homes," that was built by his grandfather, Eu Tong Sen. His parents were named Richard Eu Keng Mun (1924-2022) and Diana Eu (1922-2009).

The firstborn of four children, Eu went to Anglo-Chinese School, Singapore for his primary school education. He then later moved to England, where he attended Kent College, Canterbury as well as the University of London, where he obtained a degree in law (LLB). After graduation, he returned to Singapore in 1971.

Career
Following his return to Singapore, Eu worked for Slater Walker, a British merchant bank which had acquired control of Haw Par Brothers International (now known as Haw Par Corporation Ltd), a publicly listed company which owned Tiger Balm and other assets. In 1976, he ventured with his uncle, Andrew Eu in Hong Kong by joining a stockbroking business firm and  later becoming one of the shareholders of Hong Kong Television Broadcasts Ltd.

After his uncle died, Eu returned to Singapore and joined a stockbroking firm known as J Ballas & Co in 1978. He later joined another uncle in taking over a group of companies that was involved in computer sales.

In 1990, Eu joined Eu Yan Sang, a Chinese traditional medicine firm established by his great-grandfather, Eu Kong, as a general manager.

He led a series of buyouts from 1993 to 2000 and became CEO soon after listing Eu Yan Sang International in 2000.

In 2011, he was awarded the title of Ernst & Young Entrepreneur of the Year (Singapore).

Personal life 
Eu is married to Mary (née Chow; born 1955), with whom he has four children – three sons and one daughter.

YUis an amateur musician and released an album titled 66 in 2013.

References

Singaporean people of Cantonese descent
1947 births
Singaporean people of Chinese descent
Living people
Singaporean businesspeople